Stornoway are a British alternative indie folk band from the Cowley area of Oxford that released three albums from 2010 to 2015. The band consisted of singer, lyricist, and guitarist Brian Briggs; keyboard player Jon Ouin, bassist Oli Steadman and his brother Rob Steadman on drums. Their sound incorporated an ever-changing selection of stringed instruments and keyboards, supported by a typical pop backline of guitar, drums, and bass guitar.

Briggs and Ouin met during Freshers' week at Oxford; Briggs thought Ouin looked like a member of Teenage Fanclub, a band both of them liked that became a topic of their first conversation.  Soon after, the two began playing music together.  They advertised for a bass player, and Oli Steadman was the only person to respond to their advert.  Oli Steadman's younger brother Rob Steadman later auditioned for the role of drummer.

The band is named after the Scottish town of Stornoway on the Hebridean Isle of Lewis, which appears on all British televised weather reports and shipping forecasts. The band had never been to Stornoway when they decided to name themselves after the town. They played their first gig there on 9 April 2010 and also signed their contract with label 4AD, a British independent record label part of Beggars Group, there as well. In a 2010 interview with British music blog There Goes the Fear, Brian Briggs described the band's hunt for a name: "We were looking for somewhere that sounded a bit distant and remote and coastal. And it was a very long process, and quite a fun process that I think every band goes through trying to get the right band name. And we had a massive list, pages and pages, and the only thing that they had in common was that they were all slightly coastal or maritime-themed. So we were looking in books about knots and, I dunno, guides to natural history of the seashore. And we tried quite a few out and they all failed, and this [Stornoway] was the only one that stuck, and it was reinforced by the fact that if you see at the BBC weather forecast, Stornoway is up there…so we get this wonderful free promotion every time there’s a weather report."

In October 2016 the band announced that they would be splitting up after a farewell tour during spring 2017. They played their final show on 12 March 2017.

The band reformed for one off sets at Truck Festival in Oxfordshire and WOMAD Charlton Park in July 2022 and announced a gig with Fyfe Dangerfield in London in April 2023

Music career

2005–10: Early history
Stornoway's first radio play came in March 2006 with a demo version of "I Saw You Blink" on BBC Oxford Introducing. Radio presenter Tim Bearder was an early champion of the band and was suspended from work after barricading himself in the studio and playing an hour of Stornoway songs from their demo EP The Early Adventures of Stornoway.

One of the band's first high-profile live appearances was at Radio 1's Big Weekend in 2009, held in Lydiard Park, Swindon. Stornoway self-released their first single "Zorbing" in July 2009, playing at a number of UK summer festivals including six sets at Glastonbury festival 2009 and writing a series of articles about their experiences for the Daily Telegraph newspaper. On 1 September 2009, they played a free concert at Tate Modern, London, supported by Reverend and The Makers, to celebrate the launch of the new climate change campaign 10:10.

Their second single, "Unfaithful", was released on 28 September 2009 on CD, 7" vinyl and download, and the launch concert was held at the Institute of Contemporary Arts in London on 21 September. Their first UK tour took place from 16 to 30 October 2009, culminating in a concert at Oxford's Sheldonian Theatre, accompanied by the Oxford Millennium Orchestra. They were the first non-classical group ever to play in the centuries-old building.

In November 2009 Stornoway became the first ever unsigned band to appear on Later... with Jools Holland, and performed alongside Sting, Norah Jones, Jay-Z, and Foo Fighters. The attention gained by this appearance led to tens of thousands of views of their homemade YouTube videos, and the band were playlisted on the BBC's national radio stations. In December 2009, Stornoway were announced as entrants onto the longlist of the BBC's Sound of 2010 competition, having been selected by a panel of some 165 UK-based tastemakers. They toured Scotland and Ireland in March 2010 (dubbed the Highlands, Islands and Ireland tour), and signed their record deal in the castle grounds at Lews in Stornoway, after playing in their namesake town for the first time.

2011–12: Beachcomber's Windowsill

The band signed to the independent record label, 4AD, and on 22 March 2010, they released their third single, "I Saw You Blink".  They released their debut album Beachcomber's Windowsill on 24 May 2010. Brian Briggs said in December 2010 that any initial apprehension to signing to a label has since faded: "...we were used to doing it our own way. We’d put out EPs ourselves in Oxford and we were used to being the decision makers on everything. Having never worked with a label before, we were nervous that it would mean we would lose some say or having people twisting our arms doing certain things. And 4AD convinced us that wouldn’t be the case and that we would have creative control over everything and they were supportive of that and it’s worked really well so far, and they’ve stayed true to that."

The band organised three small shows to 300 hometown fans at the A1 Pool Hall in Oxford in Summer 2010, just prior to the launch of their album. On 30 May 2010, Beachcomber's Windowsill entered the UK Albums Chart at number 14, spending five weeks in the UK Top 100. An "unplugged" session of four songs was recorded for 4AD at the Rotunda, an abandoned doll's house museum in Iffley Village, Oxford in August 2010. They played at Glastonbury Festival 2010 and Womad Charlton Park in July 2010, along with main-stage slots at a great number of UK and European festivals. The rest of the year saw the band tour England, North America and, in February 2011, Australia as part of the St Jerome's Laneway Festival. Their last performance in their home country for 2010 was in London at the Shepherd's Bush Empire, to a sold-out crowd of 2,000, their biggest headline audience to date. The band performed the music from Beachcomber's Windowsill with extensions and additions to the instrumentation for many songs; in addition one older song and two new ones were performed, including two unplugged performances with acoustic instruments.

Following a second successful German tour and their first performances in Italy, Luxembourg and Switzerland, Stornoway spent several weeks in early 2011 at home in Oxford writing towards their second album. In April it was announced that the band would be returning to Glastonbury for the third year in a row to open the Pyramid Stage on Saturday 25 June, one of their many festival billings for the summer. Returning to America in May 2011, they will then spend the rest of the year performing at home in the UK and recording in Oxford. Their English homecoming concert for summer 2011 was at London's Somerset House on Saturday 9 July, with support from Cloud Control. A secret Somerset House warm-up show, with support from Dry The River, was announced exclusively to fans in April. The band's first concert in Oxford since November 2010 was held at the Regal, Cowley Road, on Saturday 3 September 2011 alongside fellow Oxford bands The Epstein and Dreaming Spires. Proceeds from the evening, as well those for an auctioned-off Epiphone S-210 signed by all members of the band, went to the Sumatran Orangutan Society, the Earth Trust, and the RSPB.

2012–13: Tales from Terra Firma

On 19 November 2012 Stornoway announced the release of their second studio album, Tales from Terra Firma, which was released on 11 March 2013, after spending most of 2012 recording the album. The album's first and lead single, "Knock Me on the Head", premiered on 1 January 2013 and was released alongside the album on 11 March 2013. The music video for the single premiered in late February 2013.

The album entered the UK Albums Chart at number 26, six places down from its mid-week position of number 20. The album received generally positive reviews from critics, with the Guardian giving the album a 5-star rating.

The release of Tales From Terra Firma was followed by a world tour in 2013. The band released "Farewell, Appalachia!" as a single towards the end of the year, with a video directed by Matt Cooper, of fellow Oxford band German spring offensive.

The album artwork was created by artist Kirini O.K.

2013: You Don't Know Anything
In September 2013, Stornoway announced the upcoming release of a surprise mini-album, You Don't Know Anything, containing outtakes from the Terra Firma album, to be made available exclusively to fans in time for their UK tour to close a successful year. The album was streamed exclusively by AllMusic, following free downloads of lead single "Tumbling Bay" by Rolling Stone and BBC 6 Music's Lauren Laverne in November. The band received some of their first reviews from music specialist magazines Uncut and Q.

The UK tour finished at the Barbican Centre on 8 December, the band's final show before returning to the studio, to prepare their third full album.

2014–2015: Bonxie
In June 2014, Stornoway announced the upcoming release of their 3rd LP, to be made available for pre-order through PledgeMusic – a campaign which saw the band smash 222% of their target funding just 4 days after the announcement, finally raising 513% by the end of the campaign. Fans were invited to purchase their copies of the album alongside day-trips with the band to go zorbing and/or birdwatching. The campaign came in the middle of an intensely busy summer of touring and festival appearances, including headlining their first festival in the UK. The shows and production of the 3rd LP continued through 2014, with a release date slated for April the following year. Rob Steadman moved to New York after recording was completed and began work on the artwork and design for the album. To close the year, Stornoway returned to Oxford's Sheldonian Theatre for two sold-out shows celebrating five years since their appearance there as the first ever pop band to play the venue. Stornoway were again accompanied by the Oxford Millennium Orchestra. The album was released on 13 April 2015, entering the UK Albums Chart at number 20. On 21 April, the band embarked on a tour of the UK, including two sold-out shows at Islington Assembly Hall.

2016–2017: Farewell tour and split 
In October 2016, Stornoway announced that they were to split, following a farewell tour. In a statement the band announced: "Today we bring you some sad news. After a whole decade of wonderful adventures together, we have decided to call it a day. Stornoway will become 'Stor-no-more'. Our friendship and love of music remains as strong as ever, but over the last couple of years the winds of change seem to have blown us all in different directions..."

Discography

Studio albums

Extended plays

Singles

Music videos

References

External links 
 Rob Steadman Rob Steadman

English folk musical groups
Musical groups from Oxford
Musical groups established in 2006
Musical groups disestablished in 2017
4AD artists